Handball at the 2013 Asian Youth Games was held from 13 August to 23 August at the Nanjing Jiangning Sports Centre Gymnasium and the Nanjing University of Technology Gymnasium in Nanjing.

Medalists

Medal table

Results

Boys

Preliminary round

Group A

Group B

Group C

Group D

Placement 13–16

Semifinals

Placement 15–16

Placement 13–14

Placement 9–12

Semifinals

Placement 11–12

Placement 9–10

Group stage

Group 1

Group 2

Placement 5–8

Placement 7–8

Placement 5–6

Final round

Semifinals

Bronze medal match

Gold medal match

Girls

References 

Boys Summary
Girls Summary

External links 
 Official website of the 2013 Asian Youth Games 

Asian Youth Games events
2013 Asian Youth Games events
2013 Asian Youth Games